Howell Township is an inactive township in Howell County, in the U.S. state of Missouri.

Howell Township has the name of the local Howell family.

References

Townships in Missouri
Townships in Howell County, Missouri